"Catch the Wind" is a song written and recorded by Scottish singer-songwriter Donovan.  
Pye Records released "Catch the Wind" backed with "Why Do You Treat Me Like You Do?" as Donovan's debut release (Pye 7N.15801) in the United Kingdom on 28 February 1965.  The single reached No. 4 in the United Kingdom singles chart.  Hickory Records released the single in the United States in April 1965 (Hickory 45-1309), where it reached No. 23 in the United States Billboard Hot 100.

Cash Box described it as a "medium-paced, folk-styled low-down bluesey romancer," with a Bob Dylan-like vocal.

In May 1965, Pye Records released a different version of "Catch the Wind" on Donovan's debut LP record album What's Bin Did and What's Bin Hid (NPL.18117).  While the single version featured vocal echo and a string section, the album version lacked those elements and instead featured Donovan playing harmonica.

When Epic Records was compiling Donovan's Greatest Hits in 1968, the label was either unable or unwilling to secure the rights to the original recordings of "Catch the Wind" and Donovan's follow-up single, "Colours".  Donovan re-recorded both songs for the album, with a full backing band including Big Jim Sullivan playing guitar and Mickie Most producing.

Cover versions 
Johnny Rivers from "Johnny Rivers Rocks The Folk" (1965)
Chet Atkins from "More of That Guitar Country" (1965)
Melinda Marx (1965) in Vee Jay Records
Eero Jussi and the Boys recorded it as "Tuuli Kuiskaa Vain" in Finnish (1965)
Reinhard Mey recorded a German version, "Geh und fang den Wind" (1965)  The translation was done by Joe Menke.
Paul Revere & the Raiders from Just Like Us! (1966)
The Blues Project from Live at The Cafe Au Go Go (1966)
Cher from "Chér" (1966)
Siluete from Tvoj rođendan (1966)
The Castiles (1967)
Glen Campbell from "Gentle on My Mind" (1967)
Peter Fonda on the Chisa label, as the B-side to his version of Gram Parsons' "November Night" (1967)
Claudine Longet from "Colours" (1968)
Dottie West from "What I'm Cut Out to Be" (1968)
Lester Flatt & Earl Scruggs from "Nashville Airplane" (1968)
The Lettermen from "Traces/Memories" (1969)
Eartha Kitt from "Sentimental Eartha" (1970)
Timothy Barclay as a (1970) single
We Five (1970) on the album Catch the Wind.  This version was released as a single in 1971.
Buck Owens from "Bridge Over Troubled Water" (1971)
Sammy Hagar from Sammy Hagar (1977)
Vern Gosdin from Never My Love (1978)
Susanna Hoffs from Susanna Hoffs (1994) and also appeared on the UK CD single for the song "All I Want".
Four to the Bar from "Another Son" (1995)
The Irish Descendants frpm "Gypsies and Lovers" (1995)
Arjen Anthony Lucassen from Strange Hobby (1997)
Judith Durham from "Mona Lisas" (1996)
Donnie Munro from On the West Side (1999)
Katey Sagal from "Room" (2004)
The Spill Canvas from "Denial Feels So Good" (2007)
Liane Carroll from "Slow Down" (2007)
Jimmy LaFave from "Cimarron Manifesto" (2007)
Adam Bomb and the WMD's from "Live from Tehran" (2009)
Rickie Lee Jones from "Devil You Know" (2012)
Tommy Keene (2013) from "Excitement at Your Feet"
Joan Baez and Mimi Fariña recorded a duet which appeared on the "Generations of Folk" series (Volume 3, Classic Harmonies) (2016)
John Waite on his album "Wooden Heart" (2017)
Bonnie Tyler from The Best Is Yet to Come (2021)

Miscellaneous uses in the media
In 1985, the TV show Miami Vice used the song at the beginning of the episode "Golden Triangle (Part II)".
In 1989, the TV show, The Wonder Years used the song at the end of the episode "Brightwing". 
In 1992, the movie The Efficiency Expert used the song.
In 2001, the TV show "Heartbeat" used the song in the show "Old Masters" (season 11, episode 5)
In 2002, the TV show Louis Theroux's Weird Weekends (series 3, episode 1) used the song during a scene at a hypnosis conference in Las Vegas.
In 2005, the TV show Cold Case used the song at the end of the episode "A Perfect Day".
In 2006, the TV show Alias used the song at the end of the episode "No Hard Feelings".
In 2006, the movie Flicka used the song.
In 2007, GE Ecomagination used the song in a television commercial promoting their achievements in wind power.
In 2009, thatgamecompany used the song in a promotional advertisement for the PlayStation Network title Flower.
In 2009, MassMutual used the song in a personal financial services commercials.
In 2009, the movie The Invention of Lying used nearly the entire song following the scene in which the protagonist's mother dies.
In 2009, the movie Charlie and Boots used the song in the final scene, in which the two protagonists fish together. 
In 2011, the TV show Parenthood used the song at the end of the 8 November episode, "In-Between".
In 2015, the TV show Catastrophe used the song at the end of the "Episode 4".

References

Works cited

External links
 Catch The Wind (Single) – Donovan Unofficial Site

1965 songs
1965 debut singles
1971 singles
Songs written by Donovan
Donovan songs
Johnny Rivers songs
Cher songs
Bruce Springsteen songs
Glen Campbell songs
The Lettermen songs
We Five songs
Buck Owens songs
Eartha Kitt songs
Joan Baez songs
Paul Revere & the Raiders songs
Jack Barlow songs
Pye Records singles